Ian Mackie (born 27 February 1975 in Dunfermline) is a former British sprinter who competed in the men's 100m competition at the 1996 Summer Olympics.

He was 100/200 inter counties champion.

He won 5 Scottish 100 metre titles, and the 200m title in 2001.

He was also UK 100m champion in 1997.

In the 1996 Olympic Games he recorded a 10.27 in his first heat, and then a 10.25 in the second round. In the next round, the semifinals, he recorded a DNS (did not start).

His personal best in the 100 is 10.17, set in 1996. And 2nd fastest in all time Scottish list, only behind Allan Wells He was a member of Pitreavie AAC.

In the 200m his pb was 20.85

Mackie retired in 2005 at the age of 30, during the Scottish trials for the 2006 Commonwealth Games, held in Glasgow.

References

1975 births
Scottish male sprinters
Athletes (track and field) at the 1996 Summer Olympics
Olympic athletes of Great Britain
Living people
Sportspeople from Dunfermline
Athletes (track and field) at the 1994 Commonwealth Games
Commonwealth Games competitors for Scotland
World Athletics Championships athletes for Great Britain